Forsterinaria is a genus of satyrid butterflies found in the Neotropical realm.

Species

Listed alphabetically:
The neonympha species group
Forsterinaria neonympha (C. & R. Felder, [1867]) – white-dotted ringlet
Forsterinaria proxima (Hayward, 1957)
Forsterinaria pyrczi Peña & Lamas, 2005
Forsterinaria stella (Hayward, 1957)
The pichita species group
Forsterinaria antje Peña & Lamas, 2005
Forsterinaria difficilis (Forster, 1964)
Forsterinaria emo Zubek, Pyrcz & Boyer, 2013
Forsterinaria falcata Peña & Lamas, 2005
Forsterinaria guaniloi Peña & Lamas, 2005
Forsterinaria pichita Peña & Lamas, 2005
Forsterinaria pilosa Peña & Lamas, 2005
Forsterinaria rotunda Peña & Lamas, 2005
Forsterinaria rustica (Butler, 1868)
The boliviana species group
Forsterinaria boliviana (Godman, 1905)
Forsterinaria coipa Peña & Lamas, 2005
Forsterinaria hannieri Zubek & Pyrcz, 2011
Forsterinaria inornata (C. & R. Felder, [1867]) – plain ringlet
Forsterinaria pallida Peña & Lamas, 2005 – pallid ringlet
The enjuerma species group
Forsterinaria anophthalma (C. & R. Felder, [1867])
Forsterinaria enjuerma Peña & Lamas, 2005
Forsterinaria pseudinornata (Forster, 1964)
Forsterinaria punctata Peña & Lamas, 2005
The brasilian species group
Forsterinaria itatiaia Peña & Lamas, 2005
Forsterinaria necys (Godart, [1824])
Forsterinaria quantius (Godart, [1824])

References

Euptychiina
Nymphalidae of South America
Butterfly genera